Lemke's Widow (German: Lemkes sel. Witwe) is a 1928 German silent film directed by Carl Boese. It was shot at the National Studios in Berlin. The film's sets were designed by Karl Machus. The film was remade in 1957 with Grethe Weiser in the title role.

Cast
In alphabetical order
 Lissy Arna 
 Hannelore Benzinger 
 Gerhard Dammann 
 Josefine Dora 
 Harry Grunwald 
 Fritz Kampers 
 Margarete Kupfer 
 Max Maximilian 
 Sophie Pagay 
 Hermann Picha 
 Frida Richard 
 Gustav Rickelt 
 Paul Westermeier 
 Emmy Wyda 
 Wolfgang Zilzer

References

Bibliography
 Goble, Alan. The Complete Index to Literary Sources in Film. Walter de Gruyter, 1999.

External links

1928 films
Films of the Weimar Republic
German silent feature films
Films directed by Carl Boese
German black-and-white films
National Film films